Nguyễn Văn Thuyết (born 10 January 1956) is a Vietnamese long-distance runner. He competed in the men's marathon at the 1988 Summer Olympics.

References

External links
 

1956 births
Living people
Athletes (track and field) at the 1988 Summer Olympics
Vietnamese male long-distance runners
Vietnamese male marathon runners
Olympic athletes of Vietnam
Place of birth missing (living people)